Alexei Alexandrovich Rogonov (born 6 June 1988) is a Russian former pair skater. With partner Kristina Astakhova, he is the 2015 Winter Universiade silver medalist.
 
With former skating partner Anastasia Martiusheva, he is the 2009 World Junior silver medalist, 2009 Russian Junior champion, and 2012 Russian national bronze medalist.

Personal life 
Rogonov was born on 6 June 1988 in Salsk. He and his wife, Elizaveta, were married in spring 2013.

Career 
Rogonov began skating at the age of six at an outdoor rink in Achinsk, Siberia. At the age of 16, he moved to Perm and trained as a pair skater under Ludmila Kalinina.

Partnership with Martiusheva 

Rogonov and Anastasia Martiusheva first met in Perm, skating in the same group but with different partners. After two years, Natalia Pavlova invited Rogonov to Moscow and paired him in 2006 with Martiusheva, who had arrived six months earlier. The pair won the 2009 Russian Junior title. At the 2009 World Junior Championships, they were 11th after the short program but finished first in the long program, ahead of Lubov Iliushechkina / Nodari Maisuradze. They moved up to second overall and took the silver medal.

Martiusheva/Rogonov made their senior Grand Prix debut at the 2009 Cup of Russia, where they finished seventh. They finished 9th at Russian Nationals. During the 2010–11 season, they were assigned to 2010 Skate Canada International but withdrew from the event. They won the 2010 Golden Spin of Zagreb. At the 2011 Russian Nationals, they placed 9th in the short program and 7th in the long, to finish 9th overall.

During the 2011–12 season, Martiusheva/Rogonov won the 2011 Golden Spin of Zagreb and Warsaw Cup. At the 2012 Russian Nationals, they placed second in the short program and third in the free skate and won the bronze medal.

In the 2012–13 season, Martiusheva/Rogonov won gold at the 2012 Ondrej Nepela Memorial. They competed on the Grand Prix series for the first time since 2009, finishing 5th at both of their events, the 2012 Rostelecom Cup and the 2012 NHK Trophy. They set their personal best overall score of 162.25 points. They finished 6th at the 2013 Russian Championships.

In 2013–14, Martiusheva/Rogonov began their season by taking silver at the Lombardia Trophy, followed by another silver at the 2013 Ondrej Nepela Trophy. They were seventh at their first Grand Prix assignment, the 2013 Cup of China. A week later, the pair replaced the injured Yuko Kavaguti / Alexander Smirnov at the 2013 NHK Trophy. Two days before the 2014 Russian Championships, Martiusheva injured a leg muscle in a bad fall and doctors ordered the pair to withdraw.

In January 2014, Rogonov joined a celebrity skating show in Lithuania, LNK's Šokiai ant ledo, as the partner of Lithuanian television host Gintarė Gurevičiūtė. They were named the winners.

2014–15 season: Partnership with Astakhova 
By June 2014, he formed a partnership with Kristina Astakhova, coached by Artur Dmitriev. Astakhova/Rogonov won both of their 2014–15 ISU Challenger Series (CS) events, the 2014 CS Volvo Open Cup and the 2014 CS Golden Spin of Zagreb. In between their CS events they took bronze at the 2014 Rostelecom Cup, their Grand Prix debut. They came in fourth at the 2015 Russian Championships, won silver at the 2015 Winter Universiade, and placed 10th at the 2015 World Championships, competing in the place of Ksenia Stolbova / Fedor Klimov who had withdrawn.

2015–16 season 
Astakhova/Rogonov started the 2015–16 season on the Challenger Series, taking silver at the 2015 Ondrej Nepela Trophy behind Stolbova/Klimov. Competing on the Grand Prix series, they placed 7th at the 2015 Skate America and 5th at the 2015 Cup of China. After winning silver at the 2015 Golden Spin of Zagreb, Astakhova/Rogonov finished 4th at the 2016 Russian Championships, ahead of Natalja Zabijako / Alexander Enbert. They were selected to compete at the 2016 European Championships after Stolbova/Klimov withdrew due to injury. At the 2016 Europeans Astakhova/Rogonov placed 7th after placing 7th in both the short program and the free skate.

2016–17 season 
Astakhova/Rogonov won silver at both of their 2016–17 ISU Challenger Series (CS) events, the 2016 CS Finlandia Trophy and the 2016 CS Golden Spin of Zagreb. In between their CS events they skated two Grand Prix competitions. They placed 6th at the 2016 Skate America but took the bronze medal at the 2016 Rostelecom Cup. Later they came in fourth at the 2017 Russian Championships.

2017–18 season 
Astakhova/Rogonov started their season by taking silver medal at their first 2017–18 ISU Challenger Series event, the 2017 CS Ondrej Nepela Trophy They then finished 5th at the 2017 CS Finlandia Trophy. Competing on the Grand Prix series, they won two bronze medals, first at the 2017 Rostelecom Cup and then at the 2017 NHK Trophy where they scored their personal best score of 203.64 points. This was the first international event where they scored above 200 points. They then skated their 3rd CS event, the 2017 CS Golden Spin of Zagreb where they won their 2nd CS series silver of the season. In December 2017 they placed 4th at the 2018 Russian Championships. This was the 4th consecutive time that they had placed 4th at the Russian Championships.

it was announced by the Russian Figure Skating Federation on January 23, 2018 that Ksenia Stolbova wasn't invited to the 2018 Olympics. Because of this Astakhova/Rogonov were sent instead. Astakhova/Rogonov placed 12th at the 2018 Winter Olympics. Later they placed 8th at the 2018 World Championships.

Programs

With Astakhova

With Martiusheva

Competitive highlights 
GP: Grand Prix; CS: Challenger Series; JGP: Junior Grand Prix

With Astakhova

With Martiusheva

Detailed results 
Small medals for short and free programs awarded only at ISU Championships. At team events, medals awarded for team results only.

With Astakhova

References

External links 

 
 

Russian male pair skaters
Living people
1988 births
People from Salsk
World Junior Figure Skating Championships medalists
Universiade medalists in figure skating
Figure skaters at the 2018 Winter Olympics
Olympic figure skaters of Russia
Universiade silver medalists for Russia
Competitors at the 2015 Winter Universiade
Sportspeople from Rostov Oblast